The fourth season of Too Hot to Handle premiered on December 7, 2022. The season was ordered by Netflix in February 2022, and was filmed in the Caribbean.

Cast

Episodes

After filming

References 

2022 American television seasons